Seyyed Hasan-e Hakim (also Romanized as Seyyed Ḩasan-e Hakīm) is a village in Shalahi Rural District, in the Central District of Abadan County, Khuzestan Province, Iran. At the 2006 census, its population was 891, in 152 families.

References 

Populated places in Abadan County